General Hans van der Louw is a two-star general in the Royal Netherlands Army and the former commander of 43 Gemechaniseerde (Mechanized) Brigade. since 1 January 2014 he's the Chief of the Military House of the King. As chief of the Military House of der Louw is also the adjutant-general of the King.

References

Royal Netherlands Army generals
Royal Netherlands Army personnel
Living people
Year of birth missing (living people)